Carrie is an unincorporated community in Knott County, Kentucky, United States. Carrie has a post office with ZIP code 41725.

References

Unincorporated communities in Knott County, Kentucky
Unincorporated communities in Kentucky